Fahad Al-Farhan (born 1 January 1955) is a Kuwaiti judoka. He competed at the 1976 Summer Olympics and the 1980 Summer Olympics.

References

1955 births
Living people
Kuwaiti male judoka
Olympic judoka of Kuwait
Judoka at the 1976 Summer Olympics
Judoka at the 1980 Summer Olympics
Place of birth missing (living people)